The International Journal of Nanoscience is an interdisciplinary peer-reviewed scientific journal published by World Scientific. It covers research in nanometer scale science and technology, with articles ranging from the "basic science of nanoscale physics and chemistry to applications in nanodevices, quantum engineering and quantum computing".

Abstracting and indexing 
This journal is indexed in the following databases:
Chemical Abstracts Service
CSA Aerospace Sciences Abstracts
Compendex
Inspec
Scopus

References

External links 
 

Publications established in 2002
World Scientific academic journals
English-language journals
Nanotechnology journals
Bimonthly journals